The Tokyo dialect is a variety of Japanese language spoken in modern Tokyo. As a whole, it is generally considered to be Standard Japanese, though specific aspects of slang or pronunciation can vary by area and social class.

Overview 

The Yamanote dialect is characteristic of the old upper class from the Yamanote area. Standard Japanese was based on the Yamanote dialect during the Meiji period. The Shitamachi dialect is a working-class dialect, and it preserves features of Edo Chōnin (Edokko) speech, so also called . Tokyo-style rakugo is typically played in the Shitamachi dialect.

Tokyo dialect dates back to Tokugawa Ieyasu's establishment of Edo. Large groups of people, speaking a range of dialects migrated across the country. The Kyoto dialect was the prestige language of the time and strongly influenced the Edo dialect in the early Edo period; the dialect grew inside the largest city in Japan and became the new prestige language in the late Edo period. Because of its unique history, especially in relation to the Kyoto dialect, Tokyo is a language island in the Kantō region. For example, traditional Kanto dialects have been characterized by the use of volitional and presumptive suffix -be, which is rarely used in Tokyo.

Phonology 

The Shitamachi dialect is primarily known for its lack of distinction between some phonemes that are distinct in Standard Japanese.

In addition,  is pronounced as a trill  to convey a vulgar nuance in Shitamachi speech.

Pitch accent 
A few words are pronounced different pitch accent between Yamanote and Shitamachi. The following words are typical examples:
  (another name of Kantō region): accent on ba in Yamanote, Accentless in Shitamachi.
  ("slope"): accent on ka in Yamanote, on sa in Shitamachi.
  ("next"): accent on gi in Yamanote, on tsu in Shitamachi.
 : accent on shi in Yamanote, on su in Shitamachi.
  ("sand"): accentless in Yamanote, accent on na in Shitamachi.
  ("morning sun"): accent on a in Yamanote, on sa in Shitamachi.
  ("big brother"): accent on a in Yamanote, on ni in Shitamachi.
  ("always"): accent on i in Yamanote, on tsu in Shitamachi.
  ("talk"): accentless in Yamanote, accent on na in Shitamachi.
  ("egg"): accent on ma in Yamanote, accentless in Shitamachi.
 accentless word -sama (a honorific): accent on sa in Yamanote, accentless in Shitamachi.

Grammar 
Most of the grammatical features of the Tokyo dialect are identical to the colloquial form of Standard Japanese like the examples mentioned here.

Historically, Kanto dialects lacked  (honorific speech). However, because of its connection with Kyoto and the stratification of urban society, the Tokyo dialect now has a refined keigo system.

Vocabulary 
Though it also includes a few distinctive words, it is largely indistinguishable from the standard speech of Tokyo except for phonology.

New Tokyo dialect 
Traditional Tokyo dialects can still be seen used in fiction, but most families living in Tokyo speak Standard Japanese today. The distinction between Shitamachi and Yamanote is now almost extinct.

Historically, many people moved to Tokyo from other regions and sometimes brought their dialects into Tokyo with them.

References 

 

Japanese dialects
Dialects by location
Culture in Tokyo
City colloquials